Aroga panchuli is a moth of the family Gelechiidae. It is found in Tajikistan.

The wingspan is 13.5–15 mm. The forewings are black with three narrow white fasciae. The hindwings are grey.

The larvae feed on Atraphaxis pyrifolia.

Etymology
The species is named for writer Yuri Panchul, specializing in nature sciences.

References

Moths described in 2009
Aroga
Moths of Asia